Charles William Hildebrand (August 26, 1924 – May 3, 1992) was an American football player and coach.  He served as the head football coach at Whitworth College, now Whitworth University, in 1951 and at Wake Forest University from 1960 to 1963, compiling a career college football record of 10–38.

Head coaching record

References

External links
 

1924 births
1992 deaths
BC Lions coaches
Minnesota Golden Gophers football coaches
Mississippi State Bulldogs football coaches
Mississippi State Bulldogs football players
Purdue Boilermakers football coaches
Tennessee Volunteers football coaches
Wake Forest Demon Deacons football coaches
Whitworth Pirates football coaches